South Sanpete School District is a public school district in the U.S. state of Utah. The district provides education for students in the southern half of Sanpete County. The offices for the district are located in Manti. There are three elementary schools, two middle schools, two high schools and two alternative schools within the district. Enrollment in 2004 was 2,792 students.

District schools

See also

 List of school districts in Utah
 North Sanpete School District

External links

 

School districts in Utah
Education in Sanpete County, Utah